Dani Schahin (born 9 July 1989) is a former professional footballer who played as a forward. Born in the Soviet Union, he represented Germany at youth international levels.

Early life
Schahin was born in Donetsk to a Palestinian father and Russian mother, but grew up in Baalbek in Lebanon until 1996 when his family moved to Teltow-Fläming in Germany.

Career
Schahin played as a youth for FSV Luckenwalde and Energie Cottbus before joining Hamburger SV in 2006. He broke through into HSV's reserve team in the 2007–08 season, making seven substitute appearances in the Regionalliga Nord. The following season, he scored twelve goals in 27 appearances, which made him the team's top scorer. On 8 June 2009, Schahin signed for Greuther Fürth of the 2. Bundesliga He made twelve appearances in his first season, and after a further six appearances (one goal) in the first half of the 2010–11 season, he was loaned to Dynamo Dresden in January 2011.

Schahin made a huge impact at Dynamo, scoring ten goals in fourteen games to help the club finish third in the 3. Liga and win promotion to the 2. Bundesliga via a playoff win against VfL Osnabrück. Schahin scored the decisive goal in the last league game of the season, against Kickers Offenbach, and the winning goal in the second leg against Osnabrück.

After being released by Fürth in 2012, Schahin signed for Fortuna Düsseldorf. He made his Bundesliga debut on the opening day of the 2012–13 season against FC Augsburg. Coming onto the field as a substitute in the 60th minute, Schahin went on to score both goals in a 2–0 away win. He finished the season as the club's top scorer with eight league goals, but could not prevent Fortuna from being relegated to the 2. Bundesliga.

In July 2013, Schahin was transferred to 1. FSV Mainz 05 for a fee of approximately €1.5 million, and signed a four-year contract with the club. For the 2014–15 season he was loaned out to SC Freiburg with an option to make the transfer permanent. He was sent again on loan for the 2015–16 season to FSV Frankfurt in the 2. Bundesliga, before joining Dutch club Roda JC Kerkrade on a permanent deal in 2016.

On 17 July 2018, Schahin joined Pyramids FC in the Egyptian Premier League. The following 31 January, he switched teams and countries again after signing for Spain's Extremadura UD.

Schahin ended his career in 2019.

References

External links
 
 
 

1989 births
Living people
Ukrainian emigrants to Germany
Ukrainian people of Palestinian descent
Ukrainian people of Russian descent
German footballers
Association football forwards
Germany youth international footballers
Bundesliga players
2. Bundesliga players
3. Liga players
Eredivisie players
Hamburger SV II players
SpVgg Greuther Fürth players
Dynamo Dresden players
Fortuna Düsseldorf players
Fortuna Düsseldorf II players
1. FSV Mainz 05 players
SC Freiburg players
FSV Frankfurt players
Roda JC Kerkrade players
Pyramids FC players
Extremadura UD footballers
German expatriate footballers
German expatriates in Lebanon
German expatriate sportspeople in the Netherlands
Expatriate footballers in the Netherlands
German expatriate sportspeople in Spain
Expatriate footballers in Egypt
Expatriate footballers in Spain